The Trials and Tribulations of Russell Jones is a compilation album by Ol' Dirty Bastard, released in 2002.

Track listing
"Intro"
"Caught Up" - (featuring Mack 10, Royal Flush)
"Dirty & Stinkin'" - (featuring Insane Clown Posse)
"Dogged Out" - (featuring Big Syke, Too Short)
"Free With Money"
"Anybody" - (featuring E-40, C-Murder)
"Waitress #13"
"Reunited"
"Here Comes the Judge" - (featuring Buddha Monk)
"Cute Devils"
"I Wanna Fuck" - (featuring Royal Flush)
"Highjack"
"Lintballz" - (featuring 12 O'Clock, Prodigal Sunn, Hell Razah, Popa Chief & Buddha Monk)
"Zoo Two"
"Anybody (Remix)" - (featuring E-40, C-Murder)
"Taking a Shit"
"C'mon"
"Dirty & Stinkin'" (Remix) - (featuring Insane Clown Posse)

Re-made songs 
Many of these songs contain lyrics that were used on other albums from ODB, including his debut LP Return to the 36 Chambers: The Dirty Version, and his second full-length release Nigga Please. Other lyrics on this album were used on releases by ODB's group Wu-Tang Clan.

 "Dirty and Stinkin'" contains lyrics from "Recognize" on Nigga Please
 "Dogged Out" contains lyrics from "Dog Shit" on Wu-Tang Clan's Wu-Tang Forever
 "Zoo Two" contains lyrics from "Damage (feat. GZA)" and "Brooklyn Zoo II (Tiger Crane) [feat. Ghostface Killah]" on Return to the 36 Chambers: The Dirty Version
 "C'mon" is a remake of "Baby C'mon" on Return to the 36 Chambers: The Dirty Version

Year-end charts

References

2002 compilation albums
Ol' Dirty Bastard albums